The Adventure of Super7 is the debut studio album by Indonesian boy-band Super7.

The album themed of environment takes Indonesian children to protect environment and doing positive things. It won an award for Best Children Album in the 16th Annual Anugerah Musik Indonesia.

Track listing

Awards

Release history

References

2012 albums
Super7 albums